Nangqên County, or Nangchen, is a county of the Yushu Tibetan Autonomous Prefecture and is the southernmost county-level division of Qinghai province, China, bordering the Tibet Autonomous Region to the south. 

The county seat is Xangda (shor mda’ /  ), built in a side valley and on the right bank of the Dza Chu (upper reaches of the Mekong).

History 

The county's name is derived from the former king (nang chen rgyal po) and kingdom of Nangchen, a tribal confederation that emerged as a unified Buddhist kingdom in the 13th century. The present-day's county comprises the core area of the old kingdom of Nangchen.

Memories of the kingdom of Nangchen play a role in local politics, and among Tibetan refugees who came to India from the area. Scholar Maria Turek reported that in 2015 she heard about “a man who went to various Tibetan communities in India, introducing himself as ‘the king of Nangchen’ not without some success, even though he had no credentials to prove his claim.”

A Yelpa Kagyu monastery, Tana Monastery (Jang Tana), was founded by Yelpa Yeshe Tsek in 1068. It is considered a branch monastery of Tsurpu.

Climate

Transportation
China National Highway 214

References

External links
 Nangchen historic area
 Religious life in Nangchen: Photo album

Amdo
County-level divisions of Qinghai
Yushu Tibetan Autonomous Prefecture